Boumerdès is a district in Boumerdès Province, Algeria. It was named after its capital, Boumerdès, which is also the capital of the province.

Municipalities
The district is further divided into 3 municipalities:
Boumerdès
Tidjelabine
Corso

Neighbourhoods
The neighbourhoods of Boumerdès District are:

Villages
The villages of Boumerdès District are:

Geology

Several mountain peaks are found in this district:
  (467 m)
  (444 m)
  (420 m)

Rivers

This district is crossed by several rivers:
 Meraldene River

Religion

Zawiyet Sidi Boumerdassi

History

French conquest

 Expedition of the Col des Beni Aïcha (1837)
 First Battle of the Issers (1837)

Algerian Revolution

Salafist terrorism

 2005 Tidjelabine bombing (29 July 2005)
 2006 Tidjelabine bombing (19 June 2006)
 2010 Tidjelabine bombing (7 April 2010)

Health

Mohamed Bouyahiaoui Hospital

Sport

Notable people

 Cheikh Boumerdassi (1818-1874)
 Brahim Boushaki (1912-1997)
 Mohamed Boumerdassi (1936-2010)
 Ali Bouyahiaoui (1928-1956)
 Mohamed Bouyahiaoui (1932-1958)
 Adel Djerrar (1990-)
 Mohamed Flissi (1990-)
 Ali Laskri (1955-)
 Ahmed Mahsas (1923-2013)

References

Districts of Boumerdès Province